Samuel Wilson McCleary (March 21, 1889 – August 6, 1951) was an American businessman and politician from New York.

Life 
McCleary was born on March 21, 1889 in Amsterdam, New York, the son of Ezekiel McCleary and Martha Wilson.

McCleary graduating from Amsterdam High School in 1909. He then spent two years in the Lowell Textile School, where he studied chemistry and dyeing. After leaving school, he briefly travelled for a dye firm. He then began working for McCleary, Wallin & Crouse, an Amsterdam rug and carpet manufacturing firm his father and uncle were involved in. By 1921, he was in charge of one of the departments in the plant. In 1916, he served in Company H, 2nd New York National Guard on the Mexican border. He served in that company again in 1917, during World War I, until he was honorably discharged.

In 1920, McCleary was elected to the New York State Assembly as a Republican, representing Montgomery County. He served in the Assembly in 1921, 1922, 1923, 1924, 1925, and 1926.

McClearly later worked in the insurance business. In 1936, he began working for the Bigelow-Sanford Carpet Company. By the time he died, he was the night superintendent of the company's woolen mill.

McClearly attended the First Reformed Church of Amsterdam in 1921. He was a member of the Freemasons, the Royal Arch Masonry, the Royal and Select Masters, the Shriners, and the Elks. In 1914, he married Florence Venner, who died in 1930. In 1931, he married Harriet Holman of Gloversville. His children were Mrs. J. Gardner Zerby, Samuel W., and E. Stuart. By the time he died, he attended the Second Presbyterian Church.

McCleary died at home on August 6, 1951. He was buried in Green Hill Cemetery.

References

External links 

 The Political Graveyard
 Samuel W. McCleary at Find a Grave

1889 births
1951 deaths
People from Amsterdam, New York
Lowell Technological Institute alumni
20th-century American businesspeople
Businesspeople from New York (state)
American textile industry businesspeople
American businesspeople in insurance
New York National Guard personnel
United States Army personnel of World War I
20th-century American politicians
Republican Party members of the New York State Assembly
Reformed Church in America members
Presbyterians from New York (state)
American Freemasons
Burials in New York (state)